Panchayat is an Indian Hindi-language comedy-drama webseries created by The Viral Fever for the Amazon Prime Video. The series scripted by Chandan Kumar, was directed by Deepak Kumar Mishra, which features Jitendra Kumar, Sanvikaa, Raghubir Yadav, Neena Gupta, Chandan Roy, Durgesh Kumar, Ashok Pathak, Faisal Malik and Sunita Rajwar. It chronicles the life of an engineering graduate who joins as a Panchayat secretary in a remote fictional village Phulera of Uttar Pradesh due to lack of better job options.

The series was shot in a real panchayat office located in village Mahodiya of district Sehore Madhya Pradesh. Sehore is about 40 kilometers from Bhopal, the capital city of Madhya pradesh. Mahodiya is about 10 kilometers from Sehore district headquarter. The soundtrack and score of the series is composed by Anurag Saikia, whilst cinematography and editing were performed by Amitabh Singh and Amit Kulkarni respectively. This series is Mishra's full-fledged attempt in direction after directing the respective second seasons of Permanent Roommates and Humorously Yours!.

Panchayat was premiered on Amazon Prime Video on 3 April 2020. The series received mostly positive response from critics, with the performances of the leading actors, scripting, direction and major technical aspects were praised, critics also appreciated TVF, its producers to come up with a rural village setting as compared to the previous projects, which is mostly based on the urban atmosphere. At the inaugural ceremony of Filmfare OTT Awards, the series won all the nominations under the Comedy Series category, except for Best Actress. The series was also nominated for Best Original Story, Screenplay, and Dialogues for Chandan Kumar, although it did not receive a win.

The second season of the series was scheduled to release on 20 May 2022. However, all the episodes were released two days before the actual release date. In this season, Abhishek is seen taking more interest in village politics and developments alongside preparing for CAT exam.

The series is renewed for season 3.

Premise
The series deals with the experiences of an urban engineering graduate, unfamiliar with village cultures, who on completing his degree gets a low salary position as a secretary of a Gram panchayat in a remote village called Phulera in Uttar Pradesh.

Cast
Main

 Jitendra Kumar as Abhishek Tripathi, Panchayat Secretary
Neena Gupta as Manju Devi Dubey, Pradhan Rinky ‘s mother, Brij’s wife
Raghubir Yadav as Brij Bhushan Dubey, Manju Devi's Husband, Pradhan-Pati Rinky’s father
 Faisal Malik as Prahladchand "Prahlad"  Pandey, Upa-Pradhan
 Chandan Roy as Vikas, Office Assistant
 Sanvikaa as Rinki, daughter of Pradhan

Recurring

 Biswapati Sarkar as Prateek, Abhishek's friend (season 1) 
 Satish Ray as Siddharth Gupta aka Siddhu, Abhishek 's Friend  (season 2) 
 Sunita Rajwar as Kranti Devi , Bhushan’s wife and Manju Devi’s  rival (season 2) 
 Subendhu Chakraborty as Mangal
 Shrikant Verma as Parmeshwar
 Ashok Pathak as Vinod (season 2) 
 Pankaj Jha as MLA Chandra Kishore Singh (season 2)
 Diwakar Dhyani as Sudhir Jaiswal BDO ( Season 2)
 Sushil Tondon as Bhindeshwar
 Mubarak Khan as Ward Member 1
 Kamal Rai  as Ward Member 2
 Govind Lobhani  as Ward Member 3
 Bal Mukund Rai  as Ward Member 4
 Salim Ansari  as Ward Member 5
 Mohd. Shakir  as Ward Member 6
 Dinesh Tiwari  as Ward Member 7
 Kailash Karoshiya  as Ward Member 8
 Durgesh Kumar as Bhushan aka Banrakas, Kranti’s husband and Brij and Abhishek’s rival
 Aanchal Tiwari as Raveena, Parmeshwar's daughter, Rinki's bestfriend 
 Deepesh Sumitra Jagdish as Photographer
 Sandeep Shikhar as Deenbandhu
 Jyoti Dubey as Sushma
 Rajesh Jais as Virendra Gupta (BDO)
 Aasif Khan as Ganesh, Bride Groom (season 1) 
 Prateek Pachauri as Babloo
 Dipesh Binyani as BDO's Assistant
 Ebaabdullah Khan as Dabloo
 Ankit Motghare as Theka Shopkeeper
 Usha Nagar as  Deenbandhu's Mother
 Aditya Sharma as Groom's Father/Ganesh Father
 Shashie Verma as Master Ji
 Vishwanath Chatterjee as Sub Inspector
 Kusum Shastri as District Magistrate
 Shubham as Goon 1
 Prayag Sahu as Goon 2
 Arvind Bhagwat as DM's Assistant

 Maya Gannote as a Female ward member
 Gaurav Gawai as Goon
 Chinta Loungre as a Female ward member

Episodes

Season 1

Season 2

Production

Development 
In late 2019, The Viral Fever signed a deal with the streaming platform Amazon Prime Video to produce a new web television series for their platform, after the success of their previous collaboration Hostel Daze. Sameer Saxena, the creative head of TVF picked Chandan Kumar and Deepak Kumar Mishra to script the show and direct the series. Mishra earlier directed theatre shows and drama in the past, and in his meeting with the founder and then-creative head of TVF, Arunabh Kumar, he expressed his interest in scripting, acting, and direction. Later, he went on directing the respective second season of Permanent Roommates and Humorously Yours. This was his first maiden attempt at directing a full-fledged web series for the media.

Mishra drew inspiration from the classic Doordarshan shows Malgudi Days, Potli Baba Ki, Swami and Tenali Rama, and decided to make one of them relatable to the current scenario stating that the kinds of shows are not present in this period. He and Chandan did extensive research and traveled across villages for an idea about the script, which was progressed in 2017, had been delayed due to the research work. Chandan finally drafted the script whose one-line is about an engineering graduate who joins in a low-paid salary job in a remote village, and initially titled as SDO Saheb, before they changed the title to Panchayat.

Casting 
For the main character Abhishek Tripathi, Sameer Saxena picked Jitendra Kumar, who opined that his similarities to the character of the protagonist and the regular collaborations with TVF made it possible. His character had strong similarities with that of Mohan Bhargav, portrayed by Shah Rukh Khan in the 2004 film Swades. About the contrast differences Kumar stated that "The comparisons were inevitable. But I am very happy about it, as I am a huge fan of the film. It left a deep impact on me. I even have a framed poster of the film — the one with SRK sitting in a boat surrounded by local villagers — in my home itself".

Neena Gupta plays the role of Manju Devi, the village Pradhan, and a homemaker. She initially accepted the script on the basis of the response of TVF's previous projects as well as their collaboration with Raghubir Yadav and Jitendra (in her second collaboration after Shubh Mangal Zyada Saavdhan, in which she played the latter's mother character). Yadav played the role of Brij Bhushan Dubey, husband of Manju Devi, and on the connection with his co-star, he stated "It was a great experience to work with Neena Gupta. She used to get into the character entirely. With her, it didn't feel we are here for acting".

Yadav's student Chandan Roy played the role of Vikas, the office assistant. He initially confessed that he used to go to auditions every day and one of his friends at the casting bay called him for a small role in the series, which was supposed to be shot in a single day. He initially travelled to Bhopal to shoot for the same series and met one of the assistants in TVF, where the creative team sent a script for Vikas and also got the role, whereas Deepak Kumar Mishra shot the one day portion which was initially offered to Roy.

Filming 
The series was shot in a real panchayat office located at Mahodiya Village, Sehore district in Madhya Pradesh, whereas the script was set in a fictional backdrop in Uttar Pradesh. According to the lead actor Jitendra Kumar, the series was shot in the month of March and April 2019, which wrapped within two months. However he opined as, during the time period, the temperature was extremely hot and was difficult to shoot, further adding that it was a tough time for the crew members who were 150 in number, as many used to stand in the fields holding umbrellas or lights. Raghubir Yadav eventually said about shooting in real locations, stating that "It turned out to be really well as the aesthetics and the vivid hues of the village life can be clearly seen in the show."

In an interview with Hindustan Times, Jitendra stated "My initial understanding of a panchayat was a big tree with five PANCH or sarpanch and other people sitting in its shade. They are usually fighting over a land dispute and come up with a solution right there. But actually, Panchayat is like an office and every panchayat follows a process. The show talks about the problems of villagers which appear to be very funny for us."

Soundtrack

Season 1 
Anurag Saikia composed the soundtrack and background score for Panchayat. The background score and songs include the use of acoustic guitars, pianica, accordion, and the kora, despite the setting in rural India. Saikia initially noted that "The creative producer Abhijeet Singh Parmar wanted "anything but the usual music. So we initially tried symphony, then rock, even jazz. The music for episode one took a month or two to be locked in. Once that was in place, we decided to keep the music acoustic and minimalist".

He initially added that the biggest challenge for him is to feature an ambient sort of music, with a bit of rock. However, the score featured only acoustic instruments. Saikia, in an interview with Scroll.in opined that "When an entire score for a scene got chucked, I had to bring the musicians back to the studio, and they often played for the same scene thrice a week. This happened with the theme that is used to introduce the village pradhan's husband."

One of the songs in the series Hiya Tho, received positively by the audience for producing a soulful tune with gibberish lyrics. The word "Hiya", stands for heart in Assamese. Due to his early exposure to Assamese and Western classical music, Anurag Saikia stated that "the song is inspired by the chants we have grown up hearing in monasteries in the North East". He recruited fellow Assamese singer Shankuraj Konwar for vocal duties since he would understand the song's Assamese roots.

The original soundtrack album for the series was unveiled on 10 April 2020, followed by the original score on 1 May 2020. The soundtrack features five songs plus a theme music, all has been performed and written by Saikia, whereas Vivek Hariharan, Raghav Chaitanya, Vinnie Hutton, Shankuraj Konwar sang the vocals. The background score which released as a separate album format features sixteen tracks

Release

Season 1 
Amazon Prime Video announced the release of eight new Indian originals in January 2020, with Panchayat being one of them. The official trailer of Panchayat was released on 29 March 2020. The  eight-episode series premiered on 3 April 2020. In May 2020, the makers released the Tamil and Telugu dubbed versions of the series after fans request.

Season 2 
On 28 April 2022, the second season was announced after the completion of the production. On 2 May 2022, it was announced that the second season will premiere on 20 May 2022. However, Prime Video released all the episodes on 18 May 2022, two days earlier than its actual premiere date.

Season 3 
Panchayat season 3 will involve eight episodes and is set to be released in April 2023 on Amazon Prime Video. The show features a talented cast, including Jitendra Kumar, Neena Gupta, Raghubir Yadav, and Faisal Malik. The storyline for season 3 has been kept under wraps, but it is expected to follow the lives of three panchayats in Uttar Pradesh, Maharashtra, and Rajasthan. The previous two seasons were well received, and fans are eagerly anticipating the release of season 3.

Reception

Critical response

Season 1 
Sreeparna Sengupta of The Times of India rated four out of five stars and wrote "What keeps Panchayat ticking are the well-timed dialogues and situations that keep you chuckling all along." Nandini Ramanath of Scroll.in wrote "The series is better placed to explore the foibles of its handful of characters. Panchayat unfolds as a comedy of mofussil manners. A proposal to install solar-powered lights teaches Abhishek the art of negotiating with the locals. A poorly phrased slogan for family planning leads to the discovery of hidden allies. The theft of a computer monitor is a sign that Abhishek is finally settling into his role." Ruchi Kaushal of Hindustan Times stated "Panchayat is a perfect example that what you really need to make a series sing is a solid script. If you are looking for something beyond the good old Ramayan and Mahabharat during the lockdown, Panchayat should definitely be on your must-watch list."

Ektaa Malik of The Indian Express gave three-and-a-half out of five stating "Panchayat incisively breaks the dual-tone presentation of the Indian small town in mainstream narratives. Jitendra Kumar is continuing his fine form after Shubh Mangal Zyada Saavdhan and his 'hairan-pareshan' expression has only gotten better. Though we wonder how long will he keep doing this underdog-needs-to-be-rescued roles." Nairita Mukherjee of India Today summarised "Panchayat teaches us why rural India is possibly more equipped to handle isolation compared to its urban counterparts. Jitendra Kumar and Raghuvir Yadav drive the show, but we wanted to see much more of Neena Gupta." Saraswati Datar of The News Minute stated "There are plenty of laughs but just as many genuine moments of emotion which force you to pause and feel for the people in this quirky tale. Go ahead and watch Panchayat, it's exactly the ray of sunshine we need in gloomy times like these."

Rahul Desai of Film Companion stated "The TVF show has one of the finest ensembles of recent times with Chandan Kumar's screenplay ensuring characters don't come across as caricatures." Udita Jhunjhunwala of Firstpost gave three-and-a-half out of five stating "On-target casting, immersive production design, crafty dialogue, and situations handled with a light touch to make Panchayat a satisfying watch. And who would have thought lauki (bottle gourd) could be such an effective peace offering!" Tanisha Bagchi of The Quint gave four out of five stating "Panchayat scores in its opening credits too, and by the time the sun sets on the worn-down office, we know one thing for sure - it takes a village to drive away from the fatigue that has crept in owing to Bollywood's obsession to set every other film in a small town."

Priyanka Sinha Jha of News18 reviewed "City-slickers, small-town audience or country hicks, whichever category you may fall in, Panchayat is a must-watch for those who enjoy India stories." Shilajit Mitra of Cinema Express reviewed "Though the show progresses quickly, with a new distraction emerging every episode, Abhishek stays focused on his goal. He's least bothered about Phulera and its going-ons. All he wants to do is study, bide his time and clear out. Writer Chandan Kumar and director Deepak Kumar Mishra steer clear of obvious heroisms. When Abhishek gets into a scuffle and his ego swells, the scene quickly turns to slapstick." Tanul Thakur of The Wire wrote "Panchayat has a constant lightness of touch, and that is reflected in the aesthetics, too. Its scenes aren't hurried; a consistent relaxed rhythm informs the entire show."

Accolades

Season 1

References

External links
 
 Top 5 Indian web series

2020 Indian television series debuts
Hindi television content related lists
Amazon Prime Video original programming
TVF Play Shows